Multiple Wikipedia editors have been imprisoned by their governments for contributing to the encyclopedia.

Belarus 

Mark Bernstein, a Belarusian editor of the Russian Wikipedia, was detained on 11 March 2022 for violating the Russian 2022 war censorship laws by editing Wikipedia articles about the 2022 Russian invasion of Ukraine and sentenced to 15 days detention and three years of restricted freedom.

Pavel Pernikaŭ (also Pavel Pernikov, from ), a Belarusian editor of the Belarusian Wikipedia, was sentenced on 7 April 2022 to two years in a penal colony for online postings "discrediting the Republic of Belarus" including two edits to Wikipedia about political repression in Belarus.

Saudi Arabia 

Osama Khalid, one of two known Saudi Arabian administrators of the Arabic Wikipedia, was sentenced to five years imprisonment in September 2020 for "swaying public opinion" and "violating public morals" by making edits "critical about the persecution of political activists in the country." Khalid's sentence was increased to 32 years in September 2022 as part of a campaign to lengthen the sentences of political detainees, according to Democracy for the Arab World Now and SMEX, a Lebanese non-governmental organization.

Another Saudi arrested is Ziyad al-Sofiani. He, too, was charged with "swaying public opinion" and "violating public morals" by making edits "critical about the persecution of political activists in the country." Ziyad was sentenced in September 2020 to eight years in prison.

Syria 

Bassel Khartabil was a contributor to a number of open-source projects including Wikipedia; his arrest in 2012 was likely connected to his online activity. He was executed at Adra Prison in 2015. Wikimedia established the Bassel Khartabil Free Culture Fellowship in his honor in 2017.

See also
 Censorship of Wikipedia
 Pierre-sur-Haute military radio station#Controversy over Wikipedia article
 Political prisoner
 Wikipedia community

References

Lists about Wikipedia
Political prisoners
Wikipedia people